the Rayen Castle ( Arg-e Rāyen) is an adobe castle 100 kilometers south of Kerman province, Iran. It is situated on the outskirts of the Hezar Masjed Mountains. The medieval mudbrick city of Rayen is similar to Arg-e Bam which was destroyed in an earthquake in December of 2003. Rayen displays numerous architectural elements of an Iranian citadel. It is well preserved, despite numerous natural disasters that have destroyed similar structures nearby.

the Rayen Castle is assumed to have been inhabited until 150 years ago in 1868. Although believed to be at least 1,000 years old, it may have foundations from the pre-Islamic Sassanid era. According to the old documents, it was situated on the trade route, and was one of the centres for trading valuable goods and quality textiles. It was also a centre of sword and knife manufacturing and later on guns. During the reign of third Yazdgerd of the Sassanian King, Arabs failed conquer the city presumably due to its high walls.

Gallery

See also
List of Iranian castles
Iranian architecture

External links
 Official website
 Report: "Arg-e Rayen tries to replace Bam"

References

National works of Iran
Sasanian castles
Buildings and structures completed in the 4th century
Castles in Iran
Architecture in Iran
Tourist attractions in Kerman Province
Buildings and structures in Kerman Province